A far-right social centre is a space inspired by neo-fascist and Third Position ideas, typically in the 21st century.

Italy
In Italy, a social centre called Il Bartolo was squatted in Rome, and was burnt down after one year. In 1998, Italian neo-fascists squatted in another building in Rome at Castrense 48 and called it PortAperta. In 2002 neo-fascists squatted in a building and created social centre called CasaMontag. In 2003 Italian neo-fascists squatted in a building in Rome and created the Foro 753 non-conforming centre. In 2017 members of the far-right Forza Nuova squatted commercial premises in Rome and created a food kitchen only for Italian nationals, in breach of the Constitution of Italy.

CasaPound
In 2003, Italian neo-fascists squatted in a building on Via Napoleone III on the Esquiline Hill and founded the CasaPound (the Ezra Pound's home) social centre. In June 2008 CasaPound constituted an "association of social promotion" and assumed the name CasaPound Italia. Other CasaPound squats are in Latina (Lazio region) (legalised) and Area 19 at via dei Monti della Farnesina 80 in Rome (evicted 2015).

France
Social Bastion was a French neo-fascist political movement that used squatting as a tactic before being banned as a far-right organization in 2019 by the French Government. Members of the student association GUD, squatted a building at 18 rue Port-du-Temps in Lyon, in May 2017. They planned it to help only poor French nationals. The mayor of Lyon Gérard Collomb immediately condemned the occupation and pledged to evict it. It was evicted by 100 police officers after two weeks.

In 2018 local identitarians squatted house in Angers and created social centre L’Alvarium. In 2020 court ordered to evict it.

Germany 
In 1990 in the territories of former GDR there were located some far-right social centres. One of them was Weilingstraße 122. The centre played the role as a political HQ, a living community and party space for young nationalists. In the 21st century german nationalists, inspired by CasaPound trying again to create their own social centres. In 2019 political party The Third Path owned the building in Plauen and created legal social centre P130.

Spain
In Spain, Hogar Social Madrid, also known as Hogar Social Ramiro Ledesma (the Ramiro Ledesma Social Home) was squatted in the Tetuán district in Madrid in August 2014.  It was quickly evicted the next month and the group then occupied a building in Chamberí. Some members of the group then split off and attacked the second building, which was also evicted.

Ukraine 
In 2014, during the Revolution of Dignity Ukrainian nationalists occupied a building in Kyiv city centre and used it as the headquarters of the Azov Battalion and later Cossack House.

References

Bibliography
 Domenico Di Tullio, Centri sociali di destra. Occupazioni e culture non conformi, Roma, Castelvecchi, 2006. .
 Daniele Di Nunzio ed Emanuele Toscano, Dentro e fuori Casapound. Capire il fascismo del Terzo Millennio, Roma, Armando Editore, 2011. 
 Nicola Rao, La Fiamma e la Celtica. Sessant'anni di neofascismo da Salò ai centri sociali di destra, Roma, Sperling & Kupfer, 2006. 
 Warnecke, Jakob, Failed takeover: The phenomenon of right-wing squatting. In Grashoff, Udo (eds.) Comparative Approaches to Informal Housing Around the Globe, London, UCL.Press, 2020. pp. 223-237.

See also
 Squatting
 Autonome Nationalisten
 
 Autonomous social center

Social centres
Squatting
Third Position
Far-right politics
Neo-fascism